Morderstwo (English: Murder) is a short film written and directed by Roman Polanski in 1957. This was Polanski's first completed student short at the State Film School in Łódź, Poland. The film takes place predominantly in darkness and in one room. It introduces ideas Polanski revisited throughout his career. Alternative English-language titles for the film are Murder and A Murderer.

External links
 

1957 films
Films directed by Roman Polanski
Polish short films
Polish independent films
Films with screenplays by Roman Polanski